Ositadimma "Osi" Umenyiora  (born November 16, 1981) is a British former American football player who was a defensive end in the National Football League (NFL). He played college football for the Troy Trojans and was drafted by the New York Giants in the second round of the 2003 NFL Draft. Umenyiora was a two-time Pro Bowl selection and holds the Giants franchise record for most sacks in one game. He is one of five British-born players to have won a Super Bowl, joining Marvin Allen, Scott McCready, former Giants teammate Lawrence Tynes and Jay Ajayi. He also played for the Atlanta Falcons.

Early years
Umenyiora was born in Golders Green, London to Nigerian parents. He is of Igbo descent, a native of Ogbunike town in Oyi Local Government Area of Anambra state in Nigeria. His full first name means in Igbo "from today on, things will be good."

Umenyiora's family moved from London to Nigeria when he was seven years old. At fourteen years old, Umenyiora moved to Auburn, Alabama to live with his sister. Umenyiora played only two years of high school football at Auburn High School where he was sixteen years old as a senior. Umenyiora was high school friends and teammates with fellow future NFL defensive lineman DeMarcus Ware, who was two years behind him and would follow Umenyiora to Troy.

He finished his high school football career with no scholarship offers. After the season, while Umenyiora was serving an in-school suspension, his team’s running back coach called his former college teammate Tracy Rocker, then the defensive line coach at Troy State, to tell him about Umenyiora. Rocker happened to be in town, stopped by the school, and offered Umenyiora a scholarship the same day.

College career
Umenyiora played college football for the Troy State Trojans, the only program to offer him an athletic scholarship. At Troy, Umenyiora was moved from nose guard to defensive end. In 2002, he set school records in tackles for loss in a single season (20.5) and sacks in a single game (four against Florida A&M). He finished the 2002 season with 15 sacks, the second-most in NCAA Division I. He was inducted into the Troy University Sports Hall of Fame in 2014.

Professional career

New York Giants
Despite not being invited to the 2003 NFL Draft Combine, Umenyiora was drafted in the 2nd round (56th pick overall) of the 2003 NFL Draft by the New York Giants out of Troy University.

Umenyiora established himself as a premier pass rusher in 2005, his first year as a starter. His stellar play earned All-Pro recognition and a trip to the Pro Bowl. Umenyiora achieved 14.5 sacks and 70 tackles, second only to the sixteen sacks obtained by Derrick Burgess of the Oakland Raiders.

On December 23, 2005, the Giants signed Umenyiora to a six-year contract extension for $41 million with $15 million guaranteed.

In the fourth game of the 2007 season, he set a Giants franchise record by recording six sacks against the Philadelphia Eagles. At that point in the season, the Giants had 12 sacks, tying the NFL record. He recorded his first career touchdown on October 21 against the San Francisco 49ers when he sacked Trent Dilfer, forced a fumble, recovered the fumble, and ran 75 yards for the score.

By the end of the season, Umenyiora's 13 sacks helped the Giants to an NFL regular season-leading 53 sacks. The Giants had a surprise victory in Super Bowl XLII over the New England Patriots, in part because of their strong pass rush performance. Umenyiora had four tackles in that game, three of which were solos.

During a preseason game against the New York Jets, Umenyiora suffered cartilage damage in his left knee and was required to undergo season-ending surgery. The finding by team physician Russell Warren was that Umenyiora suffered a torn lateral meniscus.

Umenyiora joined ESPN's Monday Night Football crew on October 13, 2008.

In week 1 of the 2009 season against the Washington Redskins, Umenyiora recorded his second and final career touchdown, also on a sack, forced fumble, and recovery.

On November 5, 2010, Umenyiora was named the NFC Defensive Player of the Month after recording 18 tackles (10 solo), 7.0 sacks, and six forced fumbles in the Giants' four October wins. Umenyiora and teammate Justin Tuck recorded 11.5 sacks for the year, and combined for 16 forced fumbles.

On July 29, 2011, Umenyiora did not report on the opening day of the Giants' training camp. As a result, the Giants placed him on Reserve/Did Not Report. He reported to camp late the following day. Umenyiora has claimed that general manager Jerry Reese promised to renegotiate his contract after the 2010 season, but failed to do so.

Umenyiora began practicing with his teammates on August 15, but after three practices he had arthroscopic surgery on his right knee. The team expected him to miss the season opener against the Washington Redskins on September 11.

In June 2012 Umenyiora agreed to a one-year contract with the Giants, after terminating his working relationship with agent Tony Agnone.

Atlanta Falcons
Umenyiora signed a two-year deal worth $8.55 million with the Atlanta Falcons on March 27, 2013.

Retirement
On August 26, 2015, he announced his retirement. He signed a ceremonial one-day deal with the Giants to officially retire as a member of the team.

NFL career statistics

Regular season

Media career
After retiring in 2015, he joined BBC Sport as a pundit for their NFL coverage working on the NFL International Series matches from London and the Super Bowl.  He has worked alongside Match of the Day 2 host Mark Chapman, Jason Bell, Nat Coombs, Mike Carlson and Dan Walker  and their coverage has gained rave reviews from NFL fans in the UK. He also worked on the BBC's NFL weekly highlights shows (The NFL Show/NFL This Week) which were on every week of the season.

As of the 2022 NFL season the highlights show has moved to ITV.

His pundit work has been recognized with two Royal Television Society Performance Awards for Best Sports Presenter, Commentator or Pundit in 2017 and 2019 (he was also on the three person shortlist in 2018) and the 2018 Sports Journalists' Association British Sports Pundit of the Year award.

Personal life
Umenyiora formerly resided in Cleveland, Georgia and Edgewater, New Jersey. In 2008, he made a cameo appearance in the music video "I Luv Your Girl" by The-Dream.

In February 2013, he became engaged to Miss Universe 2011, Leila Lopes. They married May 29, 2015 in Luanda, Angola, the bride's home country. They have two children together.

References

External links
 
 

1981 births
Living people
American football defensive ends
Troy Trojans football players
New York Giants players
Atlanta Falcons players
English people of Igbo descent
English people of Nigerian descent
Igbo sportspeople
National Conference Pro Bowl players
English players of American football
Sportspeople from Auburn, Alabama
People from White County, Georgia
Players of American football from Atlanta
People from Edgewater, New Jersey
People from Golders Green
Auburn High School (Alabama) alumni
English emigrants to the United States
Nigerian players of American football
Black British sportspeople